The 2012 Mississippi Hound Dogs season was the 1st and only season for the United Indoor Football League (UIFL) franchise.

On March 20, 2012, head coach Martino Theus was fired after an 0-3 start for the Hound Dogs. Former indoor player, Eric Bingham was hired as his replacement. However, when the UIFL stepped in when owner Marty Cooper couldn't afford the team, the UIFL took over the team and named Martino Theus the head coach once again. The Hound Dogs cancelled all remaining home games, but fulfilled all their remaining road games.

Schedule
Key:

Regular season
All start times are local to home team

Standings

y - clinched conference title
x - clinched playoff spot

Roster

References

Mississippi Hound Dogs
Mississippi Hound Dogs
Mississippi Hound Dogs